Kirill Shreitor (born 6 August 1986) is a Belarusian former footballer.

Career
Before 2017 season, Shreitor joined Lithuanian I Lyga side Nevėžis. He made his debut for the club on 1 April 2017 after being substituted in the second tour match against Tauras. Player was released by the club on 5 July 2017.

References

External links
 
 

1986 births
Living people
Sportspeople from Pinsk
Belarusian footballers
Association football forwards
Belarusian expatriate footballers
Expatriate footballers in Poland
Expatriate footballers in Lithuania
Belarusian expatriate sportspeople in Lithuania
FC Dynamo Brest players
FC Volna Pinsk players
FC Granit Mikashevichi players
FC Gorodeya players
FC Slutsk players
Elana Toruń players
FC Lida players
FC Lokomotiv Gomel players
FC Belshina Bobruisk players
FK Nevėžis players
FC Baranovichi players
FC UAS Zhitkovichi players
FC Sputnik Rechitsa players
Belarusian expatriate sportspeople in Poland